Kingdee International Software Group Limited is a Hong Kong Stock Exchange main board listed company, China software industry leader, leading enterprise management software company in the Asia-Pacific region. It was founded on August 8, 1993, and the headquartered is in Shenzhen, China.

On 15 February 2001, Kingdee International was listed on the Hong Kong Stock Exchange GEM with stock code 8133.HK. 20 July 2005, it transferred to Hong Kong Stock Exchange main board with stock code 0268.HK. In 2007, IBM and Lehman Brothers (bankrupted) invested and held 7.7% shares of Kingdee International. As one of the strategic shareholders of the group, Kingdee and IBM formed global strategic alliance and collaborated in the various markets and aspects such as SOA, marketing, consulting and application services, SaaS, cloud computing and e-commerce.

In August 2019, Kingdee was awarded the 2019 Amazon Web Services (AWS) Partner Network (APN) Best SaaS Partner Award at the AWS Partner Summit 2019.

References

Companies based in Shenzhen
Chinese brands
Software companies of China